The Sandwich Man is a 1983 Taiwanese film jointly directed by Hou Hsiao-hsien, Wan Jen, and Tseng Chuang-hsiang. The script by Wu Nien-jen is based on a story by Huang Chunming entitled "His Son's Big Doll" (or Puppet).

Composed of three separate stories, the film vividly portrays Taiwan during the cold war period when the country developed its economy with help from the United States. It is regarded as a hallmark of Taiwanese New Cinema.

The English title of the film is derived from the film's first vignette, directed by Hou Hsiao-hsien, which tells about a man who ekes out a living for his young family by carrying advertisement sandwich boards.

The second vignette tells of two ambitious young men who discover too late that a product they are trying to sell is defective.

The third vignette explores what happens when a poor laborer is struck by a high-ranking American official's automobile.

References

External links

CONTEXT II: Taiwanese Cinema

1983 films
Taiwanese-language films
1983 drama films
1980s Mandarin-language films
Films directed by Hou Hsiao-hsien
Films with screenplays by Wu Nien-jen
Central Motion Picture Corporation films
Taiwanese drama films